Cres is a Croatian town located on the island of Cres which can be found directly off the Istrian Peninsula and in the Kvarner Gulf.

Town
Cres is a city on the bay, as its town docks come directly into the middle of the city and are filled with boats.  There is a car park at the entrance to the city, along with multiple restaurants and a gas station.  Upon entering the city through one of the gates, there are narrow paths lined by houses and small stores.  In the center, there is an open piazza, with people selling different homemade goods. There are also shops and open air restaurants in which people can sit on the edge and watch the boats come in.

Population

Marina

Cres is home to a Blue-Flag-status marina on the outskirts of the city.  This is separate from the concrete center docks seen inside the actual city.  The marina is home to ships of many people on the island and is also home to a dry dock where many ships are repaired.  The Adriatic Sea is ideal for fishing and this port is important to the industry.

Gallery

References

Bibliography

1. Luigi Tomaz, La Magnifica Comunità di Cherso, Foreword by Arnaldo Mauri, Conselve, 2010.

 

Cities and towns in Croatia
Populated coastal places in Croatia
Populated places in Primorje-Gorski Kotar County
Cres
Seaside resorts in Croatia